Karnataka Pradesh Congress Committee (KPCC) is the unit of the Indian National Congress for the state of Karnataka. Its head office is situated at the Congress Bhawan, Queens Road, Bangalore.

Electoral performance

Karnataka Legislative Assembly

Frontal Organisation Chiefs of Karnataka PCC

Prominent members
Mallikarjun Kharge, AICC PRESIDENT ,former Union Railways Minister
D. K. Shivakumar, former minister of energy, former minister for water resources of Karnataka, former minister for medical education and current KPCC president
 Siddaramaiah, former Chief minister of Karnataka, former Deputy Chief minister of Karnataka
Y Sayeed Ahmed, (1996-2003), General Secretary, Karnataka Pradesh Congress Committee; (2015–2021) chairman, Minority Department
 G. Parameshwara, former Deputy Chief minister of Karnataka, former Home minister of Karnataka, former president of KPCC.
 Veerappa Moily, former Chief Minister of Karnataka, former Union Cabinet minister.
 Dinesh Gundu Rao, former president of KPCC, former minister for Food and Civil Supplies.

Former Karnataka PCC Presidents

2023 Legislative Assembly election

Protests and Incidents 
On 15 August 2022, the Congress held a mega "Freedom March" in Bengaluru as a show of strength against the BJP government. Lakhs of people participated in this march.

PayCM 
In September 2022, the Congress set up QR codes of "PayCM" in many parts of Bengaluru. These posters had Karnataka CM Basavaraj Bommai's dotted face with the caption "40% Accepted Here...Scan this QR code to make CM PAY for Corruption" as a knockoff of the QR code of Paytm. These posters referred to the allegations that Bommai's BJP government took bribes in awarding public contracts and recruitments. These QR codes took scanners to a website people could report corruption and make complains at a designated website - https://40percentsarkara.com/

References

External links
 
 https://40percentsarkara.com/#/home

Politics of Karnataka
Indian National Congress by state or union territory